The Mostly True Adventures of Homer P. Figg is a  historical novel by Rodman Philbrick, author of Freak the Mighty. Set during the American Civil War, it follows the adventures of a boy who is an inveterate teller of tall tales on his quest to find his older brother, a Union soldier. First published in 2009, it was named as a Newbery Honor Book in 2010. The Lexile Level of this book is 950L and the Accelerated Reader (AR) Level is 5.6. This book contains 192 pages.

Plot summary

This story is narrated by the story's main character, Homer P. Figg, an orphan in Maine living with his older brother Harold P. Figg under the cruel treatment of their mother's sister's husband, Squinton Leach.  After Harold beats up Leach for abusing them for the  time, that was the last straw and so Leach and a bunch of other guys draft Harold into the Union army illegally and Leach lies about his age saying he was 20 but in truth was only 17.  Homer is thrown into a root cellar and starts thinking about how to save him.  Homer escapes by making a tunnel and on a horse called Bob at night but gets intercepted by two bad guys named Stink and Smelt who forced him to investigate a suspected underground railroad person named Jebediah Brewster who owns a gemstone mine.  Homer then ends up in his home and is treated well by the quaker Mr. Brewster who understands the situation Homer is in.  Mr. Brewster then advised him to tell the truth, but instead Homer almost gets killed by lying but is saved by a fellow prisoner named Samuel Reed (Homer saved his life earlier by saying he was worth more alive). Homer and Reed return to the Brewsters and Reed leads the fugitive slaves back on their way to freedom. Mr. Brewster then gives Homer a young Methodist clergyman whose name is Reverend Webster B. Willow to act as his guardian.  Unfortunately when they board a ship to find his brother, Mr. Willow is seduced by a lady and her brother tricks him to give them the money and Mr. Willow asks the steward to throw him into the cargo deck with a bunch of pigs.  Once the ship docks, Homer is tormented by the crowd as a “pig-boy” until a man named Professor Fleabottom rescues him and invites him to join his medicine show as the amazing “Pig-Boy”, one night, Homer accidentally sees Professor Fleabottom handing a man on a black horse a leather satchel.  While they are running away from a colonel who sent a squad after them but Fleabottom bribes them with silver coins but are still running when they come across a rogue balloon with a man inside yelling for help, Homer and another member of the show help but are nearly killed when a bunch of Union soldiers and a captain come to arrest them for treason.  During the encounter, Homer discovers professor Fleabottom is actually a Rebel spy by the name of Reginald Robertson Crockett.  Homer escapes being arrested in a balloon but crash lands into Confederate territory and is thrown into custody in a barn with a reporter.  Homer then escapes again on the back of a stolen pony            right through the battle of Gettysburg and then lands this time in Union territory.  Homer meets Reverend Webster B. Willow who saw his brother and informs Homer that Harold wasn't in the fighting yet and will presumably arrive tomorrow in the Maine regiment.  Homer waits to intercept the Maine regiment and finds them but discovers that Harold was sent to the rear as a mutineer for slamming his officer into the mud, just like what he did to Leach because he didn't say anything nice.  The general in charge, Colonel Joshua Lawrence Chamberlain sends all men available, including the prisoners to reinforce the hill they are guarding.  Harold goes to war but Homer begs him not to go but he goes anyway, Homer is right in the fighting as a “support unit” but then shoots Harold in the leg accidentally ( it was actually a shard of rock of a rock Homer somehow hit with a revolver that hit Harold's leg)  both Homer and Harold live when the battle is over and spend the 2 years after that working on farms and small factories for money (oh yeah, Prof. Fleabottom was KIA when he bribed the guards with his gold buttons and set out for war)  Mr. Brewster then located them in their wandering and was made their legal guardian and named them his kin and heirs, unfortunately, Harold lost his leg due from an infection and Mr. Brewster asks Homer to write the story.

Stage verson
A stage version debuted at the Kennedy Center in 2012.

References

2009 American novels
Children's historical novels
American children's novels
Newbery Honor-winning works
Novels set during the American Civil War
Novels about orphans
2009 children's books
Blue Sky Press books